This is a list of notable Minahasa people.

Activism
 Maria Walanda Maramis, Indonesian national hero, pioneer of women's rights in Indonesia
 Johanna Tumbuan, pioneering figure in Indonesian independence, lecturer at the University of Indonesia

Filmmakers
Angga Dwimas Sasongko, film director
Monty Tiwa, film director

Journalism
 Alex Mendur, co-founder of the Indonesian Press Photo Service (IPPHOS), photographer of iconic photo of Bung Tomo
 Frans Mendur, co-founder of the Indonesian Press Photo Service (IPPHOS), photographer of Sukarno proclaiming the independence of Indonesia]

Law
 Ani Abbas Manopo, first Indonesian female lawyer

Literature
 F. D. J. Pangemanan, author of Tjerita Si Tjonat

Military
 Alexander Evert Kawilarang, commander of the Siliwangi Division
 Willy Ghayus Alexander Lasut, governor of North Sulawesi 
 Adolf Gustaaf Lembong, commander of 16th Division
 Gustaf Hendrik Mantik, commander of Kodam IX/Mulawarman and Kodam Jaya, governor of North Sulawesi
 Elias Daniel (Daan) Mogot, first director of the Tangerang Military Academy
 Robert Wolter Mongisidi, Indonesian national hero
 Herman Nicolas Ventje Sumual, leader of Permesta movement
 Pierre Andries Tendean, Indonesian revolutionary hero
 Frits Johanes (Broer) Tumbelaka, first governor of North Sulawesi, brokered peace between the Indonesian government and the Permesta movement
 Jacob Frederick (Joop) Warouw, commander of TT-VII/Indonesia Timur, leader of Permesta movement

Entertainers
Audy Item, pop and rock singer
Lydia Kandou, actress
Angel Karamoy, pop singer and actress
Pinkan Mambo, pop and R&B singer
Rima Melati, actress
Maria Menado, Malaysian actress
Jolene Marie Rotinsulu, Puteri Indonesia Lingkungan 2019, she will represent Indonesia at the Miss International 2019 pageant in Tokyo - Japan
Januarisman Runtuwene, musician and singer-songwriter, Indonesian Idol (season 5) winner
Mikha Tambayong, actress
Nagita Slavina Tengker, actress
Kezia Roslin Cikita Warouw, Puteri Indonesia 2016, Miss Universe 2016 Top 13 semifinalist
Stefan William, actor and singer (half-American)
Brando Windah, YouTuber

Politics
 Freddy Jaques Inkiriwang, Indonesian industrial affairs minister
 Herling Laoh, Indonesian public works and transportation minister
 Bernard Wilhelm Lapian, Indonesian national hero, church leader, second governor of Sulawesi
 Gustaaf Adolf Maengkom, Indonesian justice minister
 Alexander Andries Maramis, Indonesian national hero, Indonesian finance minister
 Arnold Isaac Zacharias Mononutu, Indonesian information minister, first ambassador of Indonesia to China, rector of Hasanuddin University
 Lambertus Nicodemus Palar, Indonesian national hero, first Indonesian representative to the United Nations
 Gerungan Saul Samuel Jacob (Sam) Ratulangi, Indonesian national hero, member of the Preparatory Committee for Indonesian Independence, first governor of Sulawesi

Religious leaders 

 Gilbert Lumoindong, Indonesian Christian clergy
 Yaakov Baruch, rabbi of the Sha'ar Hashamayim Synagogue

Science
 Arie Frederik Lasut, Indonesian national hero, co-founder of Indonesia's first Mining and Geological Service
 Marie Thomas, first Indonesian female physician, first Indonesian specialist in obstetrics and gynaecology
 Anna Adeline Warouw, second Indonesian female physician, specialist in otorhinolaryngology

Sports
 Mees Hilgers, Dutch footballer
 Winny Oktavina Kandow, Indonesian badminton player
 Flandy Limpele, Indonesian badminton player, bronze medalist at the 2004 Summer Olympics in Athens, Greece
 Deyana Lomban, Indonesian badminton player
 Gianluca Pandeynuwu, Indonesian footballer
 Jendri Pitoy, Indonesian footballer
 Greysia Polii, Indonesian badminton player, gold medalist at the 2020 Summer Olympics in Tokyo, Japan
 Yeremia Rambitan, Indonesian badminton player
 Fictor Gideon Roring, Indonesian basketball coach
 Ferry Rotinsulu, Indonesian footballer
 Ikhsan Rumbay, Indonesian badminton player
 Christopher Rungkat, Indonesian tennis player
 Zachariah Josiahno Sumanti, Indonesian badminton player
 Ezra Walian, Indonesian footballer
 Daniel Wenas, Indonesian basketball player

References

External links

 Historical Figures of Minahasa

Minahasa
Minahasa people
Minahasa